John-Michael Parker is an American politician serving as a member of the Connecticut House of Representatives from 101st district. Elected in November 2020, he assumed office on January 1, 2021.

Early life and education 
Parker was born in Madison, Connecticut and graduated from Daniel Hand High School. He earned a Bachelor of Science degree in molecular, cellular, and developmental biology from Yale University in 2010.

Career 
After graduating from Yale, Parker worked as a science teacher at the Dalton School in Manhattan. He then joined The Future Project, a New York City-based non-profit, as the organization's national dream director and later VP for development. Since 2019, he has worked as the executive director of Arts for Learning Connecticut. Parker ran for the State House in the 101st district in 2018, however he was defeated by incumbent Noreen Kokoruda by 18 votes. He was elected to the Connecticut House of Representatives in November 2020, defeating Kokoruda, and assumed office on January 1, 2021.

Electoral History

References 

Living people
People from Madison, Connecticut
Yale University alumni
Democratic Party members of the Connecticut House of Representatives
Year of birth missing (living people)